Alagawadi  is a village in the southern state of Karnataka, India. It is located in the Navalgund taluk of Dharwad district in Karnataka.

Demographics
As of the 2011 Census of India there were 1,166 households in Alagawadi and a total population of 5,838 consisting of 2,929 males and 2,909 females. There were 732 children ages 0-6.

See also
 Dharwad
 Districts of Karnataka

References

External links
 http://Dharwad.nic.in/

Villages in Dharwad district